Charlie Paton (born 1970) is a former Royal Marine and personal trainer, who was the first Scottish man to walk unsupported to the Geographic North Pole from Canada. At 11:16pm on 16 May 2000, after 70 days on the ice led by Alan Chambers, Paton raised the Union Jack at the Pole. The ten-week expedition arrived ten days overdue, suffering weight loss and without food supplies.

References

External links
 Charlie Paton's website 
 The original expedition website

1970 births
Explorers of the Arctic
Living people
Royal Marines ranks